Charlton House is a historic building in Wraxall, Somerset, England. It is a Grade II listed building.

The original building dates from the late mediaeval period, however it was altered in the early to mid 17th century and further extended between 1877 and 1884. It was the home of Antony Gibbs of Antony Gibbs & Sons a trading company, whose son William Gibbs bought the Tyntesfield estate and built up the business. The rendered stone three-storey building has a slate roof with a parapet. The hall fireplace dates from the early 17th century as does some of the fabric of the central block however most of the building was added in the 19th century. The fireplace has a gadrooned surround with clustered colonnettes on each side. These finish with caryatids and a  moulded cornice. The large overmantel is decorated with the figures of kings and women  representing Charity and Justice.

Since 1927 it has housed The Downs School, a preparatory school founded in 1894 (originally in a house overlooking Clifton Down, across the Clifton Suspension Bridge). The current Headteacher of the Downs School is Mrs Debbie Isaachsen. The school takes pupils from its reception class until year three in pre-preparatory school and then from year four to year eight in the preparatory school. At the end of year 8, most pupils feed into other local Bristol schools, such as Clifton College and Bristol Grammar School along with Queen Elizabeth's Hospital and even schools further afield such as schools in Taunton, Millfield and Sherborne.

The house was part of the Tyntesfield estate; the associated Charlton Farm was sold in 2002 and is now a residential centre of Children's Hospice South West.

References

External links
 The Downs School

Grade II listed buildings in North Somerset
Buildings and structures in North Somerset
Grade II listed houses in Somerset